Year 1530 (MDXXX) was a common year starting on Saturday (link will display the full calendar) of the Julian calendar, the 1530th year of the Common Era (CE) and Anno Domini (AD) designations, the 530th year of the 2nd millennium, the 30th year of the 16th century, and the 1st year of the 1530s decade.

Events 
 January–June 
 February 14 – Tangaxuan II, last cazonci of the Tarascan State, is executed by conquistador Nuño de Guzmán, ending the Tarascan State's independence from Spain.
 February 24 – Charles V is crowned emperor in Bologna, by Pope Clement VII.
 June 25 – The Augsburg Confession is presented to Charles V, Holy Roman Emperor.

 July–December 
 August 3 – Battle of Gavinana: Florence is captured by Spanish troops under Prince Philibert of Chalon (who is killed in the action). The Piagnon (followers of the memory of Girolamo Savonarola) are overthrown, ending the Siege of Florence, and the Medici are restored, in the person of the Pope's nephew Alessandro de' Medici.
 September 15 – The miraculous portrait of Saint Dominic in Soriano appears in Soriano Calabro, Calabria.
 October 8 – A flood engulfs Rome.
 October 26 – The Knights of Malta are formed, when the Knights Hospitaller are given Malta by Charles V. They transfer the island capital from Mdina to Birgu.
 November 5 – St. Felix's flood devastates Zeeland: a large part of the Verdronken Land van Reimerswaal is lost leading to decline of the city of Reimerswaal.
 November 24 – Tabinshwehti succeeds his father Mingyi Nyo as king of the Toungoo dynasty, following the latter's death.
 December – Martim Afonso de Sousa's expedition sets out for the Americas from Portugal.

 Date unknown 
 The ducal palace of Celle is constructed in Germany.
 Austrian forces capture Esztergom, Hungary, and raid as far as Buda.
 Humayun starts to rule the Mughal Empire.
 Erasmus publishes A handbook on manners for children (De Civilitate Morum Puerilium Libellus), which becomes popular and widely translated.
 First complete edition of the 'Zürich Bible', Huldrych Zwingli's translation into German printed by Christoph Froschauer, is published.

Births 

 January 1 – Thomas Bromley, English lord chancellor (d. 1587)
 January 5 – Gaspar de Bono, Spanish monk of the Order of the Minims (d. 1571)
 January 31 – Ōtomo Sōrin, Japanese Christian Daimyō (d. 1587)
 February 17 – Louis III, Count of Löwenstein (d. 1611)
 February 18 – Uesugi Kenshin, Japanese samurai and warlord (d. 1578)
 February 26 – David Chytraeus, German historian and theologian (d. 1600)
 March 11 – Johann Wilhelm, Duke of Saxe-Weimar (d. 1573)
 May 5 – Gabriel, comte de Montgomery, French nobleman (d. 1574)
 May 7 – Louis I de Bourbon, Prince de Condé, French Protestant general (d. 1569)
 June 17 – François de Montmorency, French nobleman (d. 1579)
 June 20 – Johannes Schenck von Grafenberg, German physician (d. 1598)
 July 3 – Claude Fauchet, French historian (d. 1602)
 August 1 – Daniel, Count of Waldeck (d. 1577)
 August 11 – Ranuccio Farnese, Italian prelate (d. 1565)
 August 14 – Giambattista Benedetti, Italian mathematician and physicist (d. 1590)
 August 25 – Ivan IV of Russia (d. 1584)
 September 30 – Geronimo Mercuriale, Italian philologist and physician (d. 1606)
 October 1 – Walter Aston, English politician (d. 1589)
 October 21 – Jacques Jonghelinck, Flemish sculptor (d. 1606)
 October 30 – Charles d'Angennes de Rambouillet, Roman Catholic cardinal (d. 1587)
 November 1 – Étienne de La Boétie, French judge and writer (d. 1563)
 November 6 – Josias Simler, Swiss scholar (d. 1576)
 December 1 – Bernardino Realino, Italian Jesuit (d. 1616)
 December 5 – Nikolaus Selnecker, German musician (d. 1592)
 date unknown
 Julius Caesar Aranzi, Italian anatomist (d. 1589)
 Vincenza Armani, Italian actress  (d. 1569)  
 Christopher Báthory, Prince of Transylvania (d. 1581)
 Jean Bodin, French jurist (d. 1596)
 Pey de Garros, Provençal poet (d. 1585)
 Wawrzyniec Grzymała Goślicki, Polish bishop, political thinker and philosopher (d. 1607)
 Thomas Hoby, English diplomat and translator (d. 1566)
 Kōriki Kiyonaga, Japanese daimyō in the Azuchi-Momoyama and Edo periods (d. 1608)
 Jan Kochanowski, Polish writer (d. 1584)
 Jean Nicot, French diplomat and scholar (d. 1606)
 Richard Tarlton, English actor (d. 1588)
 Mordecai Yoffe, Bohemian author of Levush Malkhut (d. 1612)
 Anastasia Romanovna, Russian Tsaritsa (d. 1560)
 probable
 Moses Isserles, Polish rabbi and Talmudist (d. 1572)
 Claude Le Jeune, French composer (d. 1600)
 Gráinne O'Malley, Irish ruler (d. 1603)
 Teodora Ginés, Dominican musician and composer (d. 1598)
 Shane O'Neill, Irish chieftain and rebel (d. 1567)
 Turlough Luineach O'Neill, Irish chieftain of Tyrone (d. 1595)
 Jöran Persson, Swedish politician (d. 1568)
 Nicholas Sanders, English Catholic propagandist (d. 1581)
 Ruy López de Segura, Spanish priest (d. 1580)

Deaths 

 February 7 – Enrique de Cardona y Enríquez, Spanish Catholic cardinal and bishop (b. 1485)
 February 24 – Properzia de' Rossi, Italian Renaissance sculptor (b. c. 1490)
 April 12 – Joanna la Beltraneja, princess of Castile (b. 1462)
 May 3 – Stephen VII Báthory, Hungarian nobleman and military commander
 June 4 – Maximilian Sforza, Duke of Milan (b. 1493)
 June 5 – Mercurino di Gattinara, Italian statesman and jurist (b. 1465)
 June 6 – Boniface IV, Marquess of Montferrat, Italian nobleman (b. 1512)
 June 28 – Margaret of Münsterberg, Duchess consort and regent of Anhalt (b. 1473)
 August 2 – Kanō Masanobu, chief painter of the Ashikaga shogunate (b. 1434)
 August 3 
 Francesco Ferruccio, Florentine captain (b. 1489)
 Philibert of Chalon, French nobleman (b. 1502)
 August 6 – Jacopo Sannazaro, Italian poet (b. 1458)
 August 10 – Konstanty Ostrogski, Grand Hetman of Lithuania (b. 1460)
 August 28 – Gerold Edlibach, Swiss historian (b. 1454)
 August 29 – Moise of Wallachia 
 September 13 – Queen Jeonghyeon, Korean royal consort (b. 1462)
 September 15 – Maria Paleologa, Italian noblewoman (b. 1508)
 October 10 – Thomas Grey, 2nd Marquess of Dorset, English noble (b. 1477)
 November 24 – Mingyi Nyo, founder of the Toungoo Dynasty of Burma (Myanmar) (b. 1459)
 November 29 – Cardinal Thomas Wolsey, British statesman (b. c. 1473)
 December 1 – Margaret of Austria, Regent of the Netherlands (b. 1480)
 December 22 – Willibald Pirckheimer, German humanist (b. 1470)
 December 26 – Babur, founder of the Mughal Empire (b. 1483)
 date unknown
Quentin Matsys, Flemish painter (b. 1466)
Estienne de La Roche, French mathematician (b. 1470)
Søren Norby, Danish naval commander
Tuskaloosa, Mississippian Paramount Chief
Andrea del Sarto, Italian painter (b. 1487)

References